Daniel Wendel Imhof (born 22 November 1977) is a Canadian retired soccer player who last played for St. Gallen.

Club career

Early life
Imhof was born in Wil, Switzerland, but his parents, Wendel and Edith Imhof, immigrated to Canada when he was four. Imhof grew up in Smithers, British Columbia and started a study to become a sport teacher at the University of Victoria. In this period he was key player of the university's soccer team. His two brothers play in the lower leagues in Switzerland; Dominic Imhof plays for FC Tuggen and Christoph Imhof played for FC Gossau. He also has a younger sister, Angela Imhof.

Switzerland
During the spring of 1998 Imhof went to Europe in order to secure a place in a European football club. Relatives had arranged for him to take part in a training session at their local Swiss Second Division club FC Wil, after which Marcel Koller, the head coach, offered him his first professional contract. Two years later Imhof followed Koller to his next club, FC St. Gallen with whom he would win the Swiss Super League.

VfL Bochum
During the summer of 2005 Imhof followed coach Koller to a new club for the second time by joining German 2. Bundesliga club VfL Bochum. In 2006, after Imhof's first season with Bochum, the club was promoted to the Bundesliga. When Imhof's contract expired in 2007, Bochum was at first reluctant to offer him a new contract as Imhof had not seen consistent playing time during the previous season due to injury. However, as Bochum were unable to find an adequate replacement for Imhof, he was offered a new one-year contract. Ironically, Imhof appeared in the majority of matches for Bochum during the 2007–08 season, and following the season it was rumoured that clubs such as Middlesbrough F.C. of the English Premier League, and Celtic F.C. of the Scottish Premier League were interested in him.

Return to St. Gallen
On 14 January 2010, he announced his return to FC St. Gallen, leaving VfL Bochum and the Bundesliga after four and half years.

International career
He made his debut for Canada in an October 2000 World Cup qualification match against Panama. As of November 2009, he has earned a total of 36 caps, scoring no goals. He has represented Canada in 13 FIFA World Cup qualification matches. He has also played at the 2001 Confederations Cup.

Honours

Club
St. Gallen
 Swiss Super League: 1999–2000
 Swiss Challenge League: 2011–12

VfL Bochum
 2. Bundesliga: 2005–06

References

External links
 Daniel Imhof Online Soccer Coaching Academy
 
 
 

1977 births
Living people
People from Wil
People from Smithers, British Columbia
Soccer people from British Columbia
Swiss emigrants to Canada
Canadian people of Swiss-German descent
Naturalized citizens of Canada
Association football midfielders
Canadian soccer players
Canada men's international soccer players
2001 FIFA Confederations Cup players
2002 CONCACAF Gold Cup players
2003 CONCACAF Gold Cup players
Canadian expatriate soccer players
Canadian expatriate sportspeople in Germany
Swiss expatriate footballers
Swiss men's footballers
Swiss expatriate sportspeople in Germany
FC Wil players
FC St. Gallen players
VfL Bochum players
Swiss Super League players
Swiss Challenge League players
Bundesliga players
2. Bundesliga players
Expatriate footballers in Germany
Sportspeople from the canton of St. Gallen